Martin Gerard Connors (born 1954) is a Canadian astronomer and professor.

Career 
Connors received a PhD in Physics from the University of Alberta in 1998. He is the Assistant Professor at Athabasca University. He tutors and develops courses in Mathematics, Physics, and Astronomy. He was part of the team credited with the discovery of the first Earth trojan asteroid, an asteroid that orbits the Sun on a similar orbital path as that of Earth. The 300-meter-diameter asteroid was designated . The asteroid was discovered in October 2010 by the NEOWISE team of astronomers using NASA's Wide-field Infrared Survey Explorer (WISE). Connors himself is credited with the near-Earth and Apollo asteroid , which he co-discovered together with astronomer Christian Veillet at the Mauna Kea Observatories in August 2000.

Awards and honors 
The asteroid 13700 Connors, discovered by the Spacewatch survey in 1998, was named in his honor.

See also

References 
 

20th-century Canadian astronomers
Living people
1954 births
Academic staff of Athabasca University
Discoverers of asteroids
21st-century Canadian astronomers